Montecristi is a town in the Manabí province of Ecuador and the capital of Montecristi Canton.

Montecristi was formed during the first years of the Spanish conquest, possibly between 1536 and 1537, with settlers from Manta who left their village fleeing pirate attacks. Among the first settlers appears a man named "Criste", who would have built his house on top of the mountain, so it is believed that the place acquired the name of Montecriste, which later, for idiomatic ease, ended up being called Montecristi.

As of the 2010 census Montecristi had 70,292 inhabitants.

The town is renowned for the production of Panama hats, the best quality of which is named  montecristi  after it.

Montecristi is the birthplace of Eloy Alfaro Delgado (25 June 1842-28 January 1912), president of Ecuador from 1895 to 1901 and from 1906 to 1911 and the leader of the Ecuadorian Liberal Revolution. Because of this, Montecristi was selected by the Ecuadorian Constituent Assembly in 2007 as the seat of covenants for the 2008 Constitution of Ecuador.

External links
 Sitios turísticos de Montecristi
 Municipalidad de Montecristi

Populated places in Manabí Province